Diesel Loco Shed, Visakhapatnam is an engine shed located in Visakhapatnam, Andhra Pradesh in India. Diesel Locomotive Shed, Visakhapatnam (DLS/VSKP) was established on 2 May 1965 with a holding of 13 WDM 1 Locomotives to meet the traffic needs in transportation of mainly Iron Ore from Bailadilla Mines to Visakhapatnam Port trust. It is administered by the Waltair Railway division in the East Coast Railway zone.

History 
Since its establishment in 1965 and the holding of the shed kept on increasing in capacity.

Operations 
It is the biggest Diesel Loco Shed in Indian Railways having a capacity to hold more than 300 locos, and the largest in Asia based on that capacity. It mainly provided Diesel locos to the  unelectrified sections of ECoR and sections of SCoR.

Locomotives

See also 
• Diesel Loco Shed, Erode
• Diesel Loco Shed, Gooty
• Diesel Loco Shed, Golden Rock

References 

Buildings and structures in Visakhapatnam
Rail transport in Andhra Pradesh